CR-8000 is a EDA suite launched by Japanese EDA vendor Zuken in 2011. Developed to serve the needs of multi-board level design CR-8000 is a next generation replacement for CR-5000 that was originally focused on single-board design. CR-8000 makes use of new technology including the integration of a tablet as an input device and the use of native 3D layout and actual 64-bit architecture. The CR-8000 family features four modules – System Planner; Design Gateway; Design Force; and DFM Center. These modules cover initial system planning, detailed schematic and pcb design; and optimized manufacturing output.

Tools
System Planner: A system-level design environment for upfront planning and partitioning of electronics systems.
Design Gateway: Platform for logical circuit design and verification of single and multi-board system-level electronic designs.
Design Force: A complete system on package and board design and analysis solution.
DFM Center: A manufacturing preparation and output solution supporting panelization and common output formats

See also
 CR-2000
 CR-3000
 Printed Circuit Board
 Cadstar

References

External links
 Official Zuken CR-8000 Website
 Official Zuken Website in English
 Official Zuken Website in Japanese

Electronic design automation software